Brain Works is a 2023 South Korean television series starring Jung Yong-hwa, Cha Tae-hyun, Kwak Sun-young, and Ye Ji-won. It aired from 	January 2 to February 28, 2023, on KBS2's Mondays and Tuesdays at 21:50 (KST) time slot.

Synopsis
Brain Works is a science-themed comedic investigative drama that follows the story of two men, who cannot stand each other, as they partner up to solve a criminal case involving a rare brain disease.

Cast

Main
 Jung Yong-hwa as Shin Ha-ru, a neuroscientist who has an "extraordinary brain"
 Cha Tae-hyun as Geum Myung-se, a detective who has an "altruistic brain"
 Kwak Sun-young as Seol So-jung, a forensic hypnosis investigator who has an "anxious brain"
 Ye Ji-won as Kim Mo-ran, Myung-se's ex-wife who has a "sexual brain"

Supporting

People around Ha-ru
 Jung Dong-hwan as Hwang Dong-woo, a murderer and a death row inmate who has a "psychopath brain"
 Kim Soo-jin as Shin Ji-hyung, a neurosurgeon at Korea University Hospital who has a "middle-aged brain"
 Lim Chul-hyung as Park Chi-guk, head of the Brain Hub Center, a brain science research institute affiliated with Korea University Hospital, who has a "political brain"

People around Myung-se
 Woo Hyun as Kim Gil-joong, chief of the neuroscience team at the Seobu Police Station who has a "menopausal brain"
 Kim Ah-song as Geum I-na, Myung-se's daughter who has a "teenage brain"

Extended 
 Kim Kang-il as Kang Seong-ha, a murderer
 Park Sang-hoon as Ho-young
 Han Ji-wan as Han Yeon-hee

Special appearances
 Jang Ho-il as Kim Jae-won
 Han Soo-yeon as Jung In-young
 Jang Dong-seon
 Jung Jin-young as Park Jin-young
 Lee Sang-sook as Lee Jeong-ja
 Lee Seung-joon as Heo Bum-soo
 Jeon Ik-ryeong as Kim Jae-suk
 Im Do-hwa as a virtual human
 Ha Si-eun

Production
It was reported that filming for the series was scheduled to start in July 2022.

Viewership

Notes

References

External links
  
 
 
 
 

Korean-language television shows
Korean Broadcasting System television dramas
South Korean comedy television series
South Korean mystery television series
Television series by Samhwa Networks
2023 South Korean television series debuts
2023 South Korean television series endings